Zepter International is a Swiss consumer goods enterprise, which produces, sells and distributes consumer goods through direct sales and through stores. Zepter's products are manufactured in seven Zepter factories based in Germany, Italy and Switzerland.

It was established in Linz, Austria in 1986 by its founder Philip Zepter, an entrepreneur and emigrant from SFR Yugoslavia (today's Serbia).

History
In the 1980s, Philip Zepter along with his wife left Belgrade and moved to Austria. There, Zepter worked as distributor of German kitchen utensil manufacturer "AMC International AG" and soon became one of the company's executives. After five years of working in "AMC International AG", he invented special utensil cover and patented as "Zepter utensils". In 1986, Zepter along with his wife founded "Zepter International" and in the following years made a breakthrough in the market.

Zepter International began distributing worldwide stainless steel cookware and tableware accessories, manufactured in its own plant in Milan, Italy since 1990. In 1996, Zepter Group acquired two companies, based in Switzerland, and thus branched out into the markets of light therapy medical devices (by the purchase of Bioptron AG, Wollerau and cosmetics (through Intercosmetica Neuchâtel SA, Neuchâtel).

After these investments the company's headquarters moved to Switzerland. Later on "Zepter Finance Holding AG" was established, providing services in the fields of private pensions, health care, insurance and property. As of 2016, "Zepter International" has operations in more than 60 countries worldwide. In June 2017, the company celebrated its 30-year anniversary.

Controversy
During the 2022 Russian invasion of Ukraine,  Zepter refused to join the international community and withdraw from the Russian market. Research from Yale University published on August 10, 2022 identifying how companies were reacting to Russia's invasion identified Zepter in the worst category of "Digging in", meaning Defying Demands for Exit: companies defying demands for exit/reduction of activities.

Gallery

References

External links
 

Manufacturing companies of Switzerland
Manufacturing companies established in 1986
Retail companies established in 1986
Austrian companies established in 1986
Swiss brands